Volcano Island may refer to:

Islands
High island or volcanic island, an island of volcanic origin
Taal Volcano, an island volcano in the Philippines 
Volcano Islands, a group of volcanic islands near Japan
Vulcano Island, a small volcanic island in the Tyrrhenian Sea

Other uses
Nicktoons: Battle for Volcano Island, a 2006 Nicktoons crossover video game

See also
Volcano (disambiguation)